Abeni is a two-part 2006 Nigerian-Beninese romance film produced and directed by Tunde Kelani. It depicts the social divide that occurs as a result of colonialism despite the geographical proximity between Benin and Nigeria.

Plot 
Abeni follows the story of the eponymous Abeni who was born with a silver spoon. She meets Akanni who hails from a more modest background. They are engaged to be married to other people but their meeting changes the course of already set plans.

Cast
Kareem Adepoju as Baba Wande
Abdel Hakim Amzat as Akanni
Sola Asedeko as Abeni
 Amzat Abdel Hakim as Akanni
Jide Kosoko as Abeni's father
Bukky Wright

Production and release 
Abeni was set in Yoruba-speaking areas of Nigeria and Cotonu. It employed the methods of Code-Switching, Code-Mixing and Code-Conflicting as it involved two languages and depicts how the characters overcame language barrier by paying close attention and employing the use of gesticulations.

It was a joint production between Mainframe Film and Television Productions and Laha Productions. It was released on 31 March 2006 with physical copies selling in post offices, banks and fast food joints.

Critical reception 
In a review for The Nation, Victor Akande wrote "With hilarious sub-plots woven through the core story of love lust and regains, this is a fascinating portrait of the Yoruba urban middle class that flows between Nigeria and Republic of Benin."

The film was nominated in 11 categories at the 3rd Africa Movie Academy Awards and won in 2 of the categories.

Awards and nominations

References

Further reading 

 World Cinema versus Subjectivity: How to Read Tunde Kelani's Abeni Author(s): Kenneth W. Harrow Source: Black Camera, Vol. 5, No. 2 (Spring 2014), pp. 151–167 Published by: Indiana University Press

External links
Abeni at the Internet Movie Database
Mainframe site

Beninese drama films
Nigerian romantic drama films
Best Sound Africa Movie Academy Award winners
Films directed by Tunde Kelani